The Morrow Project Vehicular Blueprints is a 1980 role-playing game supplement published for The Morrow Project by Timeline.

Contents
The Morrow Project Vehicular Blueprints is a set of 14 vehicular blueprints, detailed exterior views of the basic Morrow Project vehicles.

Reception
William A. Barton reviewed The Morrow Project Vehicular Blueprints in The Space Gamer No. 45. Barton commented that "Overall, the Morrow Project Vehicular Blueprints are a well-conceived play-aid to an excellent SF role-playing system."

References

Role-playing game supplements introduced in 1980
The Morrow Project supplements